Erin Elizabeth Gamez (born June 7, 1989) is a Democratic member of the Texas House of Representatives for House District 38, which is located in Cameron County.

References

Living people
Place of birth missing (living people)
Democratic Party members of the Texas House of Representatives
Hispanic and Latino American state legislators in Texas
21st-century American politicians
1989 births